= Ällmora träsk =

- Location within Stockholm
- Location: Stockholm County, Södermanland, Sweden
- Coordinates: 59°12′32″N 18°22′44″E
- Type: lake
- Basin countries: Sweden

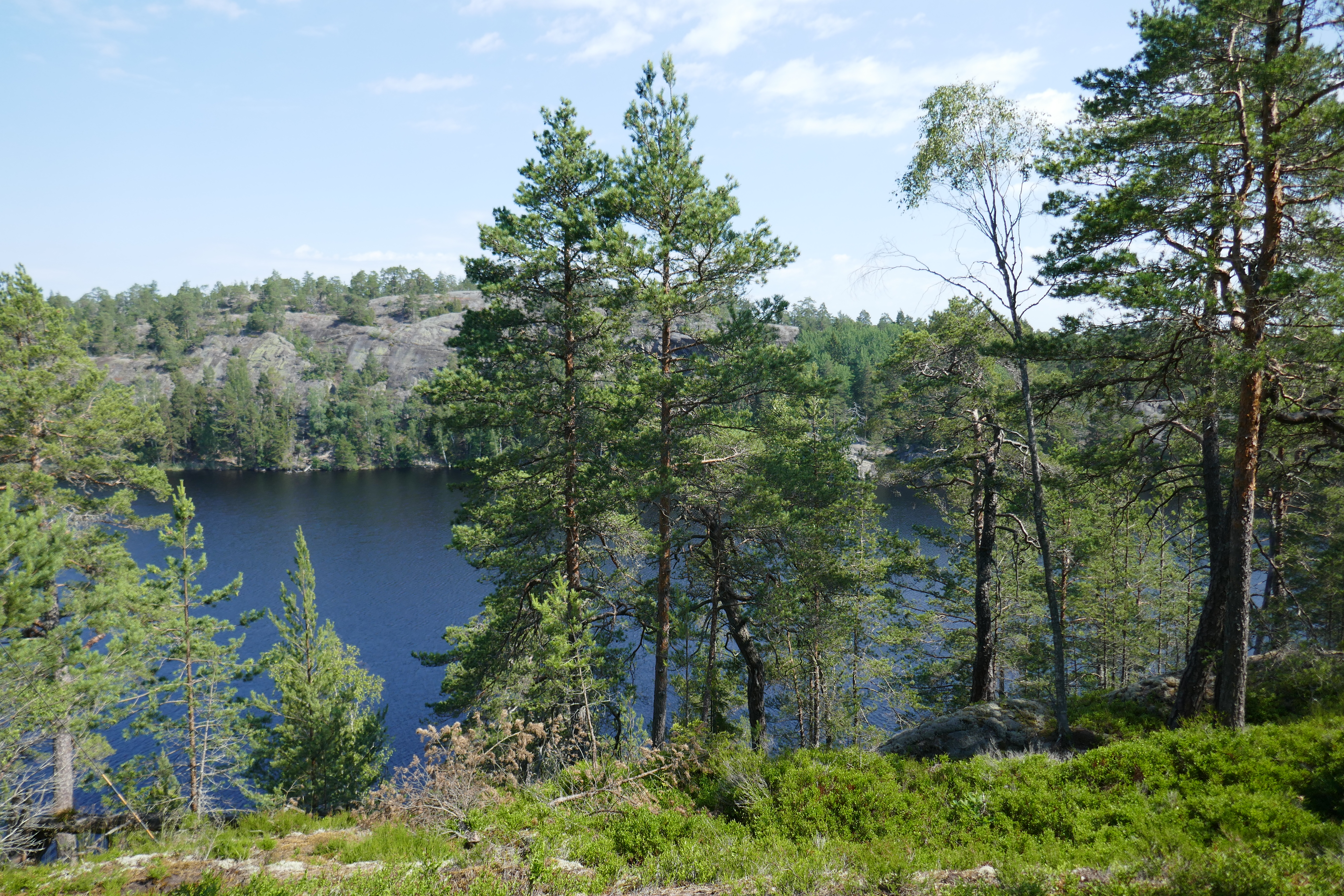

Ällmora träsk is a lake in Stockholm County, Södermanland, Sweden.
